Seachnasach (died 711) was the 17th king of the Uí Maine.

Seachnasach's genealogy lists him as ten generations removed from Máine Mór, the founder of Uí Maine: "Sechnasaigh, mic Congail, mic Eogain, mic Comain, mic Brenaind Daill, mic Cairpri Feichine, mic Fearadaig, mic Luigdheach, mic Dallain, mic Bresail, mic Máine Móir." This includes him among the Clann Comain sept of the dynasty.

During his reign Cellach mac Rogallaig won the battle of Corran, and in 710, Dluthach mac Fithcheallach, possibly a son of the previous king, "was burned."

The annals merely report his death. No details are given.

Notes

References

 Annals of Ulster at CELT: Corpus of Electronic Texts at University College Cork
 Annals of Tigernach at CELT: Corpus of Electronic Texts at University College Cork
Revised edition of McCarthy's synchronisms at Trinity College Dublin.
 Byrne, Francis John (2001), Irish Kings and High-Kings, Dublin: Four Courts Press,

External links
 Commentary by Dan M. Wiley (The Cycles of the Kings Web Project)

People from County Galway
People from County Roscommon
711 deaths
7th-century Irish monarchs
Year of birth unknown
Kings of Uí Maine